Abéché (Absha) is the fourth largest city in Chad and is the capital of Ouaddaï Region. It has within it the remnants of the ancient capital, including palaces, mosques, and the tombs of former sultans.

History
The city of Abéché was made capital of the Wadai Sultanate in the 1890s, after the wells at Ouara, the former capital, had dried out. In 1909, French troops invaded the Kingdom and established a garrison in Abéché. France took power, forcing the sultan to renounce his throne.  At that time, Abéché was the largest city in Chad with 28,000 people, but major epidemics reduced the population to 6000 in 1919. In 1935, the sultanate was restored by orders of the French government, and Muhammed Ouarada, heir to the throne after his father became king. Once one of the strongholds of the Arabic slave trade route, the city is known today for its markets, mosques, church, square (the Place de l'Indépendance) and for its sultan's palace. Abéché has several schools, a hospital, a university and is one of the major garrisons of the Armee Nationale du Tchad ANT . There is a small airport , Airport ID: AE, operated sunrise to sunset (SR-SS) with flights to N'Djaména.

On 25 November 2006, the city was taken by the Union of Forces for Democracy, a rebel group that sought to depose president Idriss Déby. Extensive looting took place during the night. On the same day, nearby Biltine was captured by the  Rally of Democratic Forces, another rebel group. A day later, both cities were retaken by the Chadian army.

On 30 October 2007, the city came to international attention when 17 French volunteers working for the charity Zoé's Ark were arrested there for alleged child abduction.

Abeche is the centrum for the delivery of humanitarian assistance for approx. 240,000 Darfurian refugees living in 12 camps east of the town, near the border with Sudan. A number of organizations opened office 2003 and 2004, e.g. UNHCR, the Red Cross, the German GTZ and UNICEF.

Demographics
Demographic evolution:

Economy
It is surrounded by savanna and is an important cattle raising center. The manufacture of camel-hair blankets is one of the industries of the area.

Transportation

It has major roads connecting it to the capital N'Djamena, as well as Sarh, and also to neighbouring Sudan. The city is served by Abéché Airport which connects to city to N'Djamena and Faya-Largeau.

Education
The Lycee Franco-Arabe school is located here.

Notable people
 
Youssouf Saleh Abbas, Chadian political figure who was Prime Minister of Chad 2008 to 2010
Arabi El Goni, politician

Climate
Abéché is the hottest major city in Chad. It gets 336 days a year above . Its rainy season is in mid-year, from June to September. The hottest months are from March to June. Köppen-Geiger climate classification system classifies its climate as hot semi-arid climate (BSh). It is one of the hottest cities on earth with average year-round daily high of over 36 degrees Celsius, and an average daily mean of around 29 degrees Celsius.

Images

References

Populated places in Chad
Ouaddaï Region